The 2009–10 CJHL season is the 49th season of the Central Junior Hockey League (CJHL). The twelve teams of the CJHL played 62-game schedules.

In March 2010, the top teams of the league played down for the Bogart Cup, the CJHL championship.  The winner of the Bogart Cup competed in the Eastern Canadian Junior "A" championship, the Fred Page Cup.  If successful against the winners of the Quebec Junior AAA Hockey League and Maritime Hockey League, the champion would then move on to play in the Canadian Junior Hockey League championship, the 2010 Royal Bank Cup.

Changes 
League changes name from Central Junior A Hockey League to Central Junior Hockey League.
Carleton Place Canadians join league from Eastern Ontario Junior B Hockey League.

Current Standings 
Note: GP = Games played; W = Wins; L = Losses; OTL = Overtime losses; SL = Shootout losses; GF = Goals for; GA = Goals against; PTS = Points; x = clinched playoff berth; y = clinched division title; z = clinched conference title

(x-) denotes berth into playoffs, (y-) denotes elimination from playoffs, (z-) clinched division.

Teams listed on the official league website.

Standings listed on official league website.

2009-10 Bogart Cup Playoffs

Playoff results are listed on the official league website.

Fred Page Cup Championship
Hosted by the Brockville Braves in Brockville, Ontario.  Brockville won the tournament, while Pembroke finished second.

Round Robin
Pembroke Lumber Kings 6 - Terrebonne Cobras (QJAAAHL) 5 OT
Brockville Braves 6 - Woodstock Slammers (MJAHL) 0
Brockville Braves 2 - Pembroke Lumber Kings 1
Pembroke Lumber Kings 7 - Woodstock Slammers (MJAHL) 4
Brockville Braves 5 - Terrebonne Cobras (QJAAAHL) 2

Semi-final
Pembroke Lumber Kings 6 - Terrebonne Cobras (QJAAAHL) 4

Final
Brockville Braves 5 - Pembroke Lumber Kings 1

2010 Royal Bank Cup Championship
Hosted by the Dauphin Kings in Dauphin, Manitoba.  Brockville finished 3rd in the round robin and was eliminated in the semi-final.

Round Robin
Brockville Braves 11 - Oakville Blades (OJAHL) 2
Dauphin Kings (MJHL) 3 - Brockville Braves 2
Vernon Vipers (BCHL) 4 - Brockville Braves 2
Brockville Braves 6 - La Ronge Ice Wolves (SJHL) 3

Semi-final
Vernon Vipers (BCHL) 2 - Brockville Braves 0

Scoring leaders 
Note: GP = Games played; G = Goals; A = Assists; Pts = Points; PIM = Penalty minutes

Leading goaltenders 
Note: GP = Games played; Mins = Minutes played; W = Wins; L = Losses: OTL = Overtime losses; SL = Shootout losses; GA = Goals Allowed; SO = Shutouts; GAA = Goals against average

Awards
Most Outstandings Player - Damian Cross (Pembroke Lumber Kings)
Scoring Champion - Damian Cross (Pembroke Lumber Kings)
Rookie of the Year - Matthew Peca (Pembroke Lumber Kings)
Top Goaltender - Doug Carr (Cornwall Colts)
Top Defenceman - Ben Reinhardt (Pembroke Lumber Kings)
Top Prospects Award - Michael Borkowski (Cumberland Grads)
Most Sportsmanlike Player - Allan McPherson (Kanata Stallions)
Top Graduating Player - Shayne Thompson (Brockville Braves)
Scholastic Player of the Year - Andrew Calof (Nepean Raiders)
Coach of the Year - Todd Gill (Brockville Braves)
Manager of the Year - Sheldon Keefe (Pembroke Lumber Kings)

See also 
 2010 Royal Bank Cup
 Fred Page Cup
 Quebec Junior AAA Hockey League
 Maritime Hockey League
 2009 in ice hockey
 2010 in ice hockey

References

External links 
 Official website of the Central Hockey League
 Official website of the Canadian Junior Hockey League

5
Central Canada Hockey League seasons